Dmitry Antilevsky (born 12 June 1997) is a Belarusian professional footballer who plays for BATE Borisov.

Club career
On 22 December 2021, Dinamo Tbilisi announced the signing of Antilevsky.

Personal life
His brother Aleksey Antilevskiy is also a professional footballer.

Honours
BATE Borisov
Belarusian Premier League champion: 2016
Belarusian Super Cup winner: 2017

Dinamo Tbilisi
Erovnuli Liga champion: 2022

References

External links 
 
 Profile at BATE Borisov website 
 

1997 births
Living people
Belarusian footballers
Belarus youth international footballers
Belarus under-21 international footballers
Belarus international footballers
Association football forwards
Belarusian expatriate footballers
Expatriate footballers in Georgia (country)
Belarusian Premier League players
Erovnuli Liga players
FC BATE Borisov players
FC Dnepr Mogilev players
FC Minsk players
FC Dinamo Minsk players
FC Torpedo-BelAZ Zhodino players
FC Dinamo Tbilisi players